The Association of Canadian Archivists (ACA), established in 1975, is a national not-for-profit organization representing over 600 archivists (and those interested in archives and archivists) in Canada. With headquarters in Ottawa, the ACA's mandate is to provide leadership to the archival profession and to increase an understanding and appreciation of Canada's archival heritage.

The ACA evolved from the Archives Section of the Canadian Historical Association. For many years it held its annual conference together with other scholarly groups as part of the Congress of the Canadian Federation for the Humanities and Social Sciences (formerly the "Learneds").

Mission
The mission of the ACA is to provide strong and diversified professional leadership and support to the Canadian archival community in the following areas: advocacy; communications; governance; public awareness; and education, research, professional standards and best practices. It does so by: 
 Providing leadership for everyone engaged in the preservation of Canada's Documentary Heritage 
 Encouraging awareness of archival activities and developments and the importance of archives to modern society 
 Advocating the interests and needs of professional archivists before government and other regulatory agencies 
 Communicating to further the understanding and cooperation amongst members of the Canadian archival system, and other information and culture based professions.
 Developing, supporting and delivering initiatives and tools to increase public awareness of archives.

Activities
Historically, the ACA produced "Guidelines Toward a Curriculum for a Master's Degree in Archival Science" prepared by Hugh Taylor and Edwin Welch in 1976. These were followed by "Guidelines for the Development of a two-year Curriculum for a Master of Archival Studies" in 1990. In the same year, the ACA collaborated with the Canadian archival community in the development and publication of Canadian archival standards for description, the Rules for Archival Description.

Ongoing ACA activities include: the production of a quarterly newsletter (ACA Bulletin) and a bi-annual scholarly journal (Archivaria); a publications program for monographs and occasional papers; an archival professional development program; a mentorship program; awards for excellence in writing and research and for contributions to the Canadian archival community; and an annual conference, with meetings and workshops. The ACA has a formal constitution and a Code of Ethics. More recently, the ACA posted the entire collection of Archivaria and its predecessor, The Canadian Archivist, to the web, much of which is freely publicly accessible.

Various committees provide support and direction on a variety of archival issues such as Outreach and Professional Learning. In addition, members are appointed to represent the association to address specific issues such as the release of Canadian censuses and the English Commission on the former National Archives of Canada. There also Special Interest Sections (SIS) that allow members interested in particular types of records or who work in a particular kind of archives to get together with others with a similar interest. These SISes include: Aboriginal Archives (SISAA); Access and Privacy (APSIS); Climate Records and Information (CRISIS); Government Records (GRSIS); Municipal Archives (MASIS); Personal Archives (SISPA); Religious Archives (RASIS); Social Justice (SJSIS); Technology and Archives (TaASIS); and University and College Archives (UCASIS). TaASIS runs the popular Archives and Technology Unconference (TAATU) in conjunction with the ACA's annual conference. The ACA also has several student chapters located at Canadian universities that offer graduate programs with an archival studies component. Student chapters are located at Dalhousie University, McGill University, the University of British Columbia Student Chapter and the University of Toronto.

A companion organization, the Association of Canadian Archivists Foundation, raises and grants funds to support the educational and research needs of the Canadian archival profession.

Past Boards of Directors

See also
 Archives Association of Ontario
 Association for Manitoba Archives

References

External links
 Official site

Other Canadian archival organizations
 Canadian Council of Archives (CCA)– for representatives of archival institutions
 Archives Association of British Columbia 
 Archives Association of Ontario
 Archives Council of Nunavut 
 Archives Council of Prince Edward Island 
 Archives Society of Alberta 
 Association des archivistes du Québec
 Association for Manitoba Archives 
 Association of Newfoundland and Labrador Archives
 Council of Archives New Brunswick
 Council of Nova Scotia Archives
 Northwest Territories Archives Council 
 Réseau de diffusion des archives du Québec
 Saskatchewan Council of Archives 
 Yukon Council of Archives

 
Organizations established in 1975